Mount Moriah Baptist Church may refer to:

Mount Moriah Baptist Church (Port Orange, Florida)
Mount Moriah Baptist Church (Middlesboro, Kentucky)
Mount Moriah Baptist Church and Cemetery, Roanoke, Virginia
Mount Moriah Missionary Baptist Church, Winter Park, Florida